Club Balonmano Villa de Aranda is a handball team based in Aranda de Duero, Province of Burgos, Castile and León. It was founded in 2000 and made its debut in Liga ASOBAL in 2012–13 season after achieving the promotion from División de Plata in 2011–12 season.

Crest, colours, supporters

Kits

Season by season

3 season in Liga ASOBAL
9 seasons in División de Plata

Current squad 2015/16

| style="font-size: 95%;" valign="top" | Goalkeepers
01  Luis Lucia Velasquez
12  Javier Santana Herrera
16  Rangel Luan da Rosa

| style="font-size: 95%;" valign="top" | Line players
05  Ignacio Pecina Tome
06  Armi Pärt
20  Tomas Moreira

| style="font-size: 95%;" valign="top" | Wingers
14  Javi Muñoz
15  Bicho
19  Victor Megias
77  Guillermo Martín Carazo
93  Manuel García Pascual

| style="font-size: 95%;" valign="top" | Back players
03  Marc Canyigueral
09  Juan Luis Ayala
23  Michail Revin
24  Matheus Perrella
26  Oswaldo Guimarães
33  Amir Cakic

| style="font-size: 95%;" valign="top" | Technical staff
 Head coach  Jacobo Cuétara
 Assistant coach  Jordi Lluelles

Stadium information
Name: - Príncipe de Asturias
City: - Aranda de Duero
Capacity: - 2,800 seats
Address: - Calle Pizarro, s/n

References

External links
Official website
Facebook profile

Sports teams in Castile and León
Spanish handball clubs
Handball clubs established in 2000
Liga ASOBAL
Sport in Aranda de Duero